= The Nelson Report =

The Nelson Report was a daily communiqué of international events, though focused on Asia, aimed at the political audience in Washington, D.C. It was run and edited by Christopher Nelson. It was started in 1983.
